Wantage was a rural district of Berkshire, England from 1894 to 1974.

It was created in 1894 as a successor to the Wantage rural sanitary district.  It was named after Wantage, which formed a separate urban district entirely surrounded by the rural district. It had its headquarters in Belmont, Wantage.

The district was abolished in 1974 (as were all other rural districts, under the Local Government Act 1972).  Its area was split between the Vale of White Horse district in Oxfordshire, and the Newbury district of Berkshire.

Civil parishes
The district contained the following civil parishes during its existence:

Notes

References
Wantage RD at Vision of Britain
Local Government Act 1972

Former districts of Berkshire
Districts of England created by the Local Government Act 1894
Districts of England abolished by the Local Government Act 1972
Rural districts of England
History of Oxfordshire